The Representation of the People Act 1969 is an Act of the Parliament of the United Kingdom. This statute is sometimes called the Sixth Reform Act. 

The Act lowered the voting age to 18. The United Kingdom was the first major democratic country to include all adults in its national franchise.

Minimum age for electors
The Act extended suffrage to 18-year-olds, the first major democratic nation to lower its age of franchise to include this age group. Previously, only those aged over 21 were permitted to vote. The 1970 United Kingdom general election is the first in which this Act had effect.

Votes were extended to undergraduate students in the constituency of their university. This followed an appeal to the High Court led for the National Union of Students by the Junior Common Room student body of Churchill College, Cambridge University under the guidance of Richard Henry Tizard, founding Fellow of Churchill College. 

Significantly, it did not extend the right to stand as a candidate for election to Parliament to under-21s. The age of candidacy for elections in the United Kingdom was lowered from 21 to 18 in 2006, with the passing of the Electoral Administration Act 2006.

Local government
It abolished plural voting in local government, except in the City of London.

See also 

 Reform Acts
 Representation of the People Act

References

Representation of the People Acts
United Kingdom Acts of Parliament 1969